This is a list of manufacturers by motor vehicle production, by year, based on Organisation Internationale des Constructeurs d'Automobiles (OICA).

Figures include passenger cars, light commercial vehicles, minibuses, trucks, buses and coaches. OICA defines these entries as follows:
 Passenger cars are motor vehicles with at least four wheels, used for the transport of passengers, and comprising no more than eight seats in addition to the driver's seat.
 Light commercial vehicles (LCV) are motor vehicles with at least four wheels, used for the carriage of goods. Mass given in tons (metric tons) is used as a limit between light commercial vehicles and heavy trucks. This limit depends on national and professional definitions, and it varies between 3.5 and 7 tons. Minibuses, derived from light commercial vehicles, are used for the transport of passengers, comprising more than eight seats in addition to the driver's seat and having a maximum mass between 3.5 and 7 tons.
 Heavy trucks (HCV) are vehicles intended for the carriage of goods. Maximum authorised mass is over the limit (ranging from 3.5 to 7 tons) of light commercial vehicles. They include tractor vehicles designed for towing semi-trailers.
 Buses and coaches are used for the transport of passengers, comprising more than eight seats in addition to the driver's seat, and having a maximum mass over the limit (ranging from 3.5 to 7 tonnes) of light commercial vehicles.

Overview 
Motor vehicle production by manufacturer (top five groups)

The summary chart includes the five largest worldwide automotive manufacturing groups as of 2017 by number of vehicles produced. Those same groups have held the top 5 positions since 2007; only Hyundai / Kia had a lower rank until it took the fifth spot from DaimlerChrysler in 2006. Figures were compiled by the International Organization of Motor Vehicle Manufacturers (OICA):
2000, 
2001, 
2002, 
2003, 
2004, 
2005, 
2006, 
2007, 
2008, 
2009, 
2010, 
2011, 
2012, 
2013, 
2014, 
2015,
2016,
2017.

 The Toyota group includes Daihatsu and Hino.
 The Volkswagen group includes VW, Audi, SEAT, Skoda and luxury brands.
 The General Motors group includes Daewoo since 2005, Saab until 2009 (sold to Spyker in 2010), SAIC-GM-Wuling until 2014, and Opel and Vauxhall until 2016 (sold to Groupe PSA in 2017 and subsequently owned by Stellantis in 2021).
 Hyundai and Kia have operated as part of the Hyundai Motor Group since 1998.
 The Ford group includes Jaguar Land Rover until 2007 (sold to Tata in 2008) and Volvo until 2009 (sold to Geely in 2010).

2017 
This is a list of largest manufacturers by production in 2017.

2016 
This is a list of largest manufacturers by production in 2016. Some figures were amended in the 2017 report.

2015 
Rank of manufacturers by production in 2015

2014 
Rank of manufacturers by production in 2014

2013 
Rank of manufacturers by production in 2013

2012 
Rank of manufacturers by production in 2012

2011

2010

2009

2008 
This is a list of the 20 largest automotive manufacturers, ranked by their production volume in 2008.

2007 
This is a list of the 20 largest automotive manufacturers, ranked by their production volume in 2007.

2006 
This is a list of the 20 largest automotive manufacturers, ranked by their production volume in 2006.

2005 
This is a list of the 20 largest automotive manufacturers, ranked by their production volume in 2005.

2004 
This is a list of the 20 largest automotive manufacturers, ranked by their production volume in 2004.

See also 
 Automotive industry
 List of countries by motor vehicle production
 List of countries by motor vehicle production in the 2000s
 List of countries by motor vehicle production in the 2010s

Notes

References 

Automotive industry by country
 Production
 Production
 Production
Economy-related lists of superlatives